This is a list of trans characters in fiction,  i.e. characters that either self-identify as trans or have been identified by outside parties to be trans. Listed characters are either recurring characters, cameos, guest stars, or one-off characters. This page does not include trans characters in film or television.

For more information about fictional characters in other parts of the LGBTQ community, see the lists of lesbian (with sub-pages for characters in anime and animation), bisexual (with sub-sections for characters in anime and animation), gay, non-binary, pansexual, asexual, and intersex characters.

The names are organized alphabetically by surname (i.e. last name), or by single name, if the character does not have a surname. If more than two characters are in one entry, the last name of the first character is used.

Animation

Comics

Games

Literature

Theatre

Plays

Musicals

Operas

See also

 List of fictional polyamorous characters
 Lists of LGBT figures in fiction and myth
 LGBT themes in comics
 List of LGBT-themed speculative fiction
 List of LGBT characters in soap operas
 List of LGBT-related films

Notes

References

Citations

Bibliography
 

Trans
Transgender-related lists